This is a list of Australian political memoirs:

 The Andren Report: An Independent Way in Australian Politics by Peter Andren (2003)
 No Job For A Woman by Sallyanne Atkinson (2016)
 Father of the House: The Memoirs of Kim E. Beazley by Kim Edward Beazley
 A Cabinet Diary: A Personal Record of the First Keating Government by Neal Blewett (1999)
 Through the Wall: Reflections on Leadership, Love and Survival by Anna Bligh (2015)
 On the Other Hand: Sketches and Reflections From Political Life by Neil Brown (1993)
 Dame Nancy: The Autobiography of Dame Nancy Buttfield by Nancy Buttfield (1992)
 As It Happened by John Button (1998)
 Be Just and Fear Not by Arthur Calwell (1972)
 The Cameron Diaries by Clyde Cameron (1990)
 Thoughtlines: Reflections of a Public Man by Bob Carr (2002)
 Diary of a Foreign Minister by Bob Carr (2014)
 I Do Recall: Reflections on a Social and Political Journey by Jeff Carr (2008)
 My Life and Times by Joe Chamberlain (1998)
 Roosters and Featherdusters by Brian Chatterton (2013)
 Chika by Kerry Chikarovski (2004)
 Chipp by Don Chipp (1987)
 Cleary, Independent by Phil Cleary (1998)
 The Fights of My Life by Greg Combet (2011)
 The Costello Memoirs by Peter Costello (2009)
 Cold Tea for Brandy: A Tale of Protest, Painting and Politics by Joan Coxsedge (2007)
 Pioneers, Politics and People: A Political Memoir by John Cramer (1989)
 A Simple Country Lad: A Kind of Autobiography by Gordon Dean (2007)
 Public Life, Private Grief: A Memoir of Political Life and Loss by Mary Delahunty (2010)
 Felicia: The Political Memoirs of Don Dunstan by Don Dunstan (1981)
 I Had 50,000 Bosses: Memoirs of a Labor Backbencher 1946-1975 by Gil Duthie (1984)
 Inside the Hawke-Keating Government: A Cabinet Diary by Gareth Evans (2014)
 Backbench: Behind the Headlines by Peter Fisher (2011)
 Big Blue Sky: A Memoir by Peter Garrett (2015)
 Sticks and Stones by Arthur Gietzelt (2014)
 My Story by Julia Gillard (2014)
 Good Company, Henry "Jo" Gullett: Horseman, Soldier, Politician by Jo Gullett (1992)
 Untamed and Unashamed: Time to Explain by Pauline Hanson (2007)
 Hayden, An Autobiography by Bill Hayden (1996)
 Politics, Death and Addiction by Carolyn Hirsh (2013)
 The Hawke Memoirs by Bob Hawke (1994)
 Lazarus Rising by John Howard (2011)
 A Thinking Reed by Barry Jones (2006)
 Speaking For Myself Again: Four Years With Labor and Beyond by Cheryl Kernot (2002)
 Matters for Judgment: An Autobiography by John Kerr (1978)
 Killen: Inside Australian Politics by Jim Killen (1985)
 The Latham Diaries by Mark Latham (2005)
 Machine Rules: A Political Primer by Stephen Loosley (2015)
 My Life: The Illustrated Autobiography of Dame Enid Lyons by Enid Lyons (1949)
 The Memoirs of Norman John Oswald Makin by Norman Makin (1982)
 Stirring the Possum: A Political Autobiography by Jim McClelland (1989)
 Tales From The Political Trenches by Maxine McKew (2012)
 The Tumult and the Shouting by Frank McManus (1977)
 Afternoon Light: Some Memories of Men and Events by Robert Menzies (1968)
 The Measure of Years by Robert Menzies (1970)
 The Peter Nixon Story: An Active Journey by Peter Nixon (2012)
 The Independent Member for Lyne by Rob Oakeshott (2014)
 Carpenter to Cabinet: Thirty-Seven years of Parliament by George Pearce (1951)
 My Reminiscences by George Reid (1917)
 Living Politics by Margaret Reynolds (2007)
 Whatever It Takes by Graham Richardson (1994)
 Black Dog Daze: Public Life, Private Demons by Andrew Robb (2011)
 Catching the Waves: Life In and Out of Politics by Susan Ryan (1999)
 Against the Tide by B. A. Santamaria (1981)
 Having a Go: The Memoirs of Sid Spindler by Sid Spindler (2008)
 'The Good Fight: Six Years, Two Prime Ministers and Staring Down the Great Recession by Wayne Swan (2014)
 Straight Left by Tom Uren (1995)
 Confessions of a Failed Finance Minister by Peter Walsh (1995)
 Chops for Breakfast: A Lucky Generation in an Age of Accelerating Change by Bob Whan (2014)
 Windsor's Way by Tony Windsor (2015)

 
Political bibliographies